The 2019–20 Liga IV Vâlcea, (known as Superliga Nurvil for sponsorship reasons), was the 52nd season of the Liga IV Vâlcea, the fourth tier of the Romanian football league system. The season began on 24 August 2019 and was ended officially on 16 June 2020, after as suspended in March due to 2019–20 COVID-19 pandemic. Minerul Costești was crowned as county champion.

Team changes

To Liga IV Vâlcea
Relegated from Liga III
 —
Promoted from Liga V Vâlcea
 Băile Olănești
 Oltul Ionești
 Viitorul Valea Mare

From Liga IV Vâlcea
Promoted to Liga III
 Viitorul Dăești 
Relegated to Liga V Vâlcea
 Oltețul Alunu 2016
 Mihăești

Other changes
 DCM Râmnicu Vâlcea, AS Râmnicu Vâlcea and Viitorul Valea Mare withdrew from Liga IV and were replaced by Păușești Otăsău, Viitorul Budești and Oltul Drăgoești.
 Băbeni was spared from relegation.

Competition format
The 12 teams will play a regular season, followed by a play-off and play-out. The regular season is a double round-robin tournament. At the end of the regular season, the first six teams will play a championship play-off and the  last six teams  will play a relegation play-out.

Regular season

League table

Promotion play-off

Champions of Liga IV – Vâlcea County face champions of Liga IV – Olt County and Liga IV – Teleorman County.

Region 5 (South–West)

Group B

See also

Main Leagues
 2019–20 Liga I
 2019–20 Liga II
 2019–20 Liga III
 2019–20 Liga IV

County Leagues (Liga IV series)

 2019–20 Liga IV Alba
 2019–20 Liga IV Arad
 2019–20 Liga IV Argeș
 2019–20 Liga IV Bacău
 2019–20 Liga IV Bihor
 2019–20 Liga IV Bistrița-Năsăud
 2019–20 Liga IV Botoșani
 2019–20 Liga IV Brăila
 2019–20 Liga IV Brașov
 2019–20 Liga IV Bucharest
 2019–20 Liga IV Buzău
 2019–20 Liga IV Călărași
 2019–20 Liga IV Caraș-Severin
 2019–20 Liga IV Cluj
 2019–20 Liga IV Constanța
 2019–20 Liga IV Covasna
 2019–20 Liga IV Dâmbovița
 2019–20 Liga IV Dolj 
 2019–20 Liga IV Galați
 2019–20 Liga IV Giurgiu
 2019–20 Liga IV Gorj
 2019–20 Liga IV Harghita
 2019–20 Liga IV Hunedoara
 2019–20 Liga IV Ialomița
 2019–20 Liga IV Iași
 2019–20 Liga IV Ilfov
 2019–20 Liga IV Maramureș
 2019–20 Liga IV Mehedinți
 2019–20 Liga IV Mureș
 2019–20 Liga IV Neamț
 2019–20 Liga IV Olt
 2019–20 Liga IV Prahova
 2019–20 Liga IV Sălaj
 2019–20 Liga IV Satu Mare
 2019–20 Liga IV Sibiu
 2019–20 Liga IV Suceava
 2019–20 Liga IV Teleorman
 2019–20 Liga IV Timiș
 2019–20 Liga IV Tulcea
 2019–20 Liga IV Vaslui
 2019–20 Liga IV Vrancea

References

External links
 Official website 

 
Sport in Vâlcea County